Threads is a 1984 British-Australian apocalyptic war drama television film jointly produced by the BBC, Nine Network and Western-World Television Inc. Written by Barry Hines and directed and produced by Mick Jackson, it is a dramatic account of nuclear war and its effects in Britain, specifically on the city of Sheffield in Northern England. The plot centres on two families as a confrontation between the United States and the Soviet Union erupts. As the nuclear exchange between NATO and the Warsaw Pact begins, the film depicts the medical, economic, social and environmental consequences of nuclear war.

Shot on a budget of £400,000, the film was the first of its kind to depict a nuclear winter. It has been called "a film which comes closest to representing the full horror of nuclear war and its aftermath, as well as the catastrophic impact that the event would have on human culture." It has been compared to the earlier Academy Award-winning programme The War Game produced in Britain two decades prior and its contemporary counterpart The Day After, a 1983 ABC television film depicting a similar scenario in the United States. It was nominated for seven BAFTA awards in 1985 and won for Best Single Drama, Best Design, Best Film Cameraman and Best Film Editor.

Plot

In the town of Sheffield, Ruth Beckett and Jimmy Kemp plan to marry after learning of Ruth's unplanned pregnancy. The plot serves as a distraction to the viewer against the backdrop of a gradually escalating confrontation in Iran where the Soviet Union has invaded in response to a US-backed coup there. The United States mobilizes its own forces and occupies the southern part of the country, and increases its naval presence in the Persian Gulf. The U.S. also deploys B-52 Stratofortress bombers to Turkey when it learns the Soviet Union has moved nuclear warheads into Mashad.

The British reinforce NATO in Western Europe, following news of a Warsaw Pact build up in Eastern Germany. The President attempts to resolve the situation in Iran peacefully by proposing a joint withdrawal to the Soviet leader. The Soviets however ignore the American ultimatum, resulting in the conventional attack by U.S. bombers over the Soviet base at Mashad. The Soviets respond with a nuclear-tipped air defense missile, which is responded with the detonation of an American battlefield nuclear weapon over Mashad.

News of the breakout of hostilities between the US and Soviet forces spurs Britain into panic buying and looting. The government enacts the Emergency Powers Act, and local authorities are granted powers to suspend peacetime function and to confiscate property and material for civil defense purposes. Travel is restricted for essential services only, the government having taken control of British Airways and cross-Channel ferries to assist with transporting troops to Europe.

At 8:30am in Britain (which, the narrator notes would be 3:30am in Washington; implying that Western response would be at it's slowest as the President and the senior staff would be asleep), Attack Warning Red is transmitted. Minutes later, a nuclear detonation occurs over the North Sea which generates an electromagnetic pulse, causing major damage to communications across Britain and northwestern Europe. A secondary attack then impacts NATO military targets including RAF Finningley, 17 miles from Sheffield. The detonation and mushroom cloud is seen from Sheffield which plunges into chaos. A third and final attack targets primary economic targets such as the Tinsley Viaduct. The detonation causes massive structural damage to Sheffield, and an estimated 12 to 30 million people in the UK are instantly killed in the wider exchange.

An hour following the attack, prevailing winds have sent fallout from a ground burst at Crewe over Sheffield. Communications between local authorities are shown to be established but limited due to disruption. Fires are left to burn uncontrollably, as the danger of fallout is too high. A month later soldiers make their way into what remains of the Sheffield Town Hall where the local authorities were headquartered; who have long suffocated to death. A year following, sunlight returns but with a higher ultraviolet index due to damage to the ozone layer, which in turn increases the likelihood of cataracts and cancer. Crop cultivation is poor due to the lack of fertilizers and equipment. Capital punishment is authorized by the Government, whose attempts to maintain order are largely ignored by the surviving British public. Since money serves no value, food takes place as the only form of currency; awarded for labor and withheld as punishment. The narrator states the cruel irony in that for the more people who die, the more food there is to go around. Several people including Ruth flee to the Buxton countryside, where she gives birth to her daughter.

Ten years later, what remains of Britain's surviving population has dropped to a medieval level of 4 to 11 million people. Survivors work in cultivating crops, and children born after the war speak a broken form of English. Ruth dies in bed, survived by her 10-year-old daughter Jane. Industry begins to return with limited electricity and steam-powered technology, but the population continues to live in barbaric squalor. Three years after Ruth's death, Jane and two boys are caught stealing food. One of the boys is killed, and Jane and the other boy engage in a struggle for the food that degenerates into "crude intercourse". Months later, Jane gives birth in a makeshift hospital, and the film ends on a silent freeze frame as she looks at her newborn baby.

Cast

 Paul Vaughan as the Narrator
 Karen Meagher as Ruth Beckett
 Reece Dinsdale as Jimmy Kemp
 David Brierley as Mr Bill Kemp
 Rita May as Mrs Rita Kemp
 Nicholas Lane as Michael Kemp
 Jane Hazlegrove as Alison Kemp
 Phil Rose as Doctor Talbot 
 Henry Moxon as Mr Beckett
 June Broughton as Mrs Beckett
 Sylvia Stoker as Granny Beckett
 Harry Beety as Clive J. Sutton (Controller)
 Ruth Holden as Marjorie Sutton
 Ashley Barker as Bob
 Michael O'Hagan as Chief Superintendent Hirst
 Phil Askham as Mr Stothard
 Anna Seymour as Mrs Stothard 
 Fiona Rook as Carol Stothard
 Steve Halliwell as Information Officer
 Joe Holmes as Mr Langley
 Victoria O'Keefe as Jane
 Lesley Judd as TV newsreader
 Lee Daley as Spike
 Marcus Lund as Gaz
 Ian Parkinson & Tony Grant as Radio Announcers

Production and themes

Threads was first commissioned (under the working title Beyond Armageddon) by the Director-General of the BBC Alasdair Milne, after he watched the 1965 drama-documentary The War Game, which had not been shown on the BBC when it was made, due to pressure from the Wilson government, although it had had a limited release in cinemas. Mick Jackson was hired to direct the film, as he had previously worked in the area of nuclear apocalypse in 1982, producing the BBC Q.E.D. documentary A Guide to Armageddon. This was considered a breakthrough at the time, considering the previous banning of The War Game, which BBC staff believed would have resulted in mass suicides if aired. Jackson subsequently travelled around the UK and the US, consulting leading scientists, psychologists, doctors, defence specialists and strategic experts in order to create the most realistic depiction of nuclear war possible for his next film. Jackson consulted various sources in his research, including the 1983 Science article Nuclear Winter: Global Consequences of Multiple Nuclear Explosions, penned by Carl Sagan and James B. Pollack. Details of a possible attack scenario and the extent of the damage were derived from Doomsday, Britain after Nuclear Attack (1983), while the ineffective post-war plans of the UK government came from Duncan Campbell's 1982 exposé War Plan UK. In portraying the psychological damage suffered by survivors, Jackson took inspiration from the behaviour of the Hibakusha and Magnus Clarke's 1982 book Nuclear Destruction of Britain. Sheffield was chosen as the main location partly because of its "nuclear-free zone" policy that made the council sympathetic to the local filming and partly because it seemed likely that the USSR would strike an industrial city in the centre of the country.

Jackson hired Barry Hines to write the script because of his political awareness. The relationship between the two was strained on several occasions, as Hines spent much of his time on set, and apparently disliked Jackson on account of his middle class upbringing. They also disagreed about Paul Vaughan's narration, which Hines felt was detrimental to the drama. As part of their research, the two spent a week at the Home Office training centre for "official survivors" in Easingwold which, according to Hines, showed just "how disorganised [post-war reconstruction] would be." 

Auditions were advertised in The Star, and took place in the ballroom of Sheffield City Hall, where 1,100 candidates turned up. Extras were chosen on the basis of height and age, and were all told to look "miserable" and to wear ragged clothes; the majority were CND supporters. The makeup for extras playing third-degree-burn victims consisted of Rice Krispies and tomato ketchup. The scenes taking place six weeks after the attack were shot at Curbar Edge in the Peak District National Park; because weather conditions were considered too fine to pass off as a nuclear winter, stage snow had to be spread around the rocks and heather, and cameramen installed light filters on their equipment to block out the sunlight. Although Jackson initially considered casting actors from Granada Television's Coronation Street, he later decided to take a neorealist approach, and opted to cast relatively unknown actors in order to heighten the film's impact through the use of characters the audience could relate to.

In order for the horror of Threads to work, Jackson made an effort to leave some things unseen: "to let images and emotion happen in people's minds, or rather in the extensions of their imaginations." He later recalled that while BBC productions would usually be followed by phone calls of congratulations from friends or colleagues immediately after airing, no such calls came after the first screening of Threads. Jackson later "realised...that people had just sat there thinking about it, in many cases not sleeping or being able to talk." He stated that he had it on good authority that Ronald Reagan watched the film when it aired in the US. Along with Hines, Jackson also received a letter of praise from Labour leader Neil Kinnock, stating "the dangers of complacency are much greater than any risks of knowledge."

Broadcast and release history

Threads was a co-production of the BBC, Nine Network and Western-World Television, Inc. It was first broadcast on BBC Two on 23 September 1984 at 9:30 pm, and achieved the highest ratings on the channel (6.9 million) of the week. It was repeated on BBC One on 1 August 1985 as part of a week of programmes marking the fortieth anniversary of the atomic bombings of Hiroshima and Nagasaki, which also saw the first television screening of The War Game (which had been deemed too disturbing for television in the 20 years since it had been made). Threads was not shown again on British screens until the digital channel BBC Four broadcast it in October 2003. It was also shown on UKTV Documentary in September 2004 and was repeated in April 2005.

Threads was broadcast in the United States on cable network Superstation TBS on 13 January 1985, with Ted Turner presenting the introduction. This was followed by a panel discussion on nuclear war. It was also shown in syndication to local commercial stations and, later, on many PBS stations. In Canada, Threads was broadcast on Citytv in Toronto, CKVU in Vancouver and CKND in Winnipeg, while in Australia it was shown on the Nine Network on 19 June 1985. Unusually for a commercial network, it broadcast the film without commercial breaks; many commercial outlets in the United States and Canada that broadcast the film also did so without commercial interruption, or interrupting only for disclaimers or promos.
In January 2018, journalist Julie McDowall led a distributed viewing of the film, encouraging the audience to share their reactions on Twitter under the hashtag #threaddread, as part of a campaign to ask the BBC to show the movie for the first time since 2003.

Home media
Threads was originally released by BBC Video (on VHS and, for a very short period, Betamax) in 1987 in the United Kingdom. The film was re-released on both VHS and DVD in 2000 on the Revelation label, followed by a new DVD edition in 2005. Due to licensing difficulties the 1987 release replaced Chuck Berry's recording of his song "Johnny B. Goode" with an alternative recording of the song. In all these cases, the original music over the opening narration was removed, again due to licensing problems; this was an extract from the Alpine Symphony by Richard Strauss, performed by the Dresden State Opera Orchestra, conducted by Rudolf Kempe (HMV ASD 3173).

On 13 February 2018, Threads was released by Severin Films on Blu-ray in the United States. The programme was scanned in 2K from a broadcast print for this release, including extras such as an audio commentary with Director Mick Jackson and interviews with actress Karen Meagher, Director Of Photography Andrew Dunn, Production Designer Christopher Robilliard and film writer Stephen Thrower.  This is also the first home video release in which the extract from the Alpine Symphony remains intact.

On 9 April 2018, Simply Media released a Special Edition DVD in the UK, featuring a different 2K scan, restored and remastered from the original BBC 16mm CRI prints, which Severin did not have access to. This also featured all the original music, for the first time on home video in the UK. Whereas the previous releases had no extra features, the Special Edition included commentaries and associated documentaries.

Reception

Initial

Threads was not widely reviewed, but the critics who reviewed it gave generally positive reviews. John J. O'Connor of The New York Times wrote that the film "is not a balanced discussion about the pros and cons of nuclear armaments. It is a candidly biased warning. And it is, as calculated, unsettlingly powerful." Rick Groen of The Globe and Mail wrote that "[t]he British crew here, headed by writer Barry Hines and producer/director Mick Jackson, accomplish what would seem to be an impossible task: depicting the carnage without distancing the viewer, without once letting him retreat behind the safe wall of fictitious play. Formidable and foreboding, Threads leaves nothing to our imagination, and Nothingness to our conscience." In his movie guide, Leonard Maltin gave the film a rating of three stars (out of a possible four). He called Threads "Britain's answer to The Day After" and wrote that the film was "unrelentingly graphic and grim, sobering, and shattering, as it should be."

Retrospective
Retrospective reviews have been very positive. On Metacritic, the film has a score of 92 based on 5 reviews, indicating "universal acclaim", whilst it has a Rotten Tomatoes score of 100% based on 10 reviews (with an average score of 8.90/10). The critical consensus reads: "An urgent warning against nuclear conflict, Threads is a chilling hypothetical that achieves visceral horror with its matter-of-fact presentation of an apocalypse." Peter Bradshaw of The Guardian called it a "masterpiece", writing: "It wasn't until I saw Threads that I found that something on screen could make me break out in a cold, shivering sweat and keep me in that condition for 20 minutes, followed by weeks of depression and anxiety." Sam Toy of Empire gave the film a perfect score, writing that "this British work of (technically) science fiction teaches an unforgettable lesson in true horror" and went on to praise its ability "to create an almost impossible illusion on clearly paltry funds." Jonathan Hatfull of SciFiNow  gave a perfect score to the remastered DVD of the film. "No one ever forgets the experience of watching Threads. [...It] is arguably the most devastating piece of television ever produced. It's perfectly crafted, totally human and so completely harrowing you'll think that you'll probably never want to watch it again." He praised the pacing and Hines' "impeccable" screenplay and described its portrayal of the "immediate effects" of the bombing as "jaw-dropping [...] watching the survivors in the days and weeks to come is heart-breaking." Both Little White Lies and The A.V. Club have emphasized the film's contemporary relevance, especially in light of political events such as Brexit. According to the former, the film paints a "nightmarish picture of a Britain woefully unprepared for what is coming, and reduced, when it does come, to isolation, collapse and medieval regression, with a failed health service, very little food being harvested, mass homelessness, and the pound and the penny losing all value."

Awards and nominations

The film was nominated for seven BAFTA awards in 1985. It won for Best Single Drama, Best Design, Best Film Cameraman and Best Film Editor. Its other nominations were for Best Costume Design, Best Make-Up, and Best Film Sound.

See also
 Able Archer 83,  NATO command post exercise that resulted in the 1983 nuclear war scare and changed thinking about nuclear war in Britain.
 List of nuclear holocaust fiction
 Nuclear weapons in popular culture
 Nuclear weapons and the United Kingdom
 Operation Square Leg, a military analysis of the effects of a nuclear war on Britain.
 Protect and Survive, the 1970s British government information films on nuclear war.
 When the Wind Blows, a 1986 animated British film that shows a nuclear attack on Britain by the Soviet Union from the viewpoint of a retired couple.
 Testament, a 1983 film about a nuclear explosion over the United States

References

External links

 'Threads' in pictures at BBC South Yorkshire
 
 
 
 Internet Archive

1984 television films
1984 films
1980s disaster films
1980s science fiction drama films
1980s speculative fiction films
Anti-nuclear films
Anti-nuclear movement in the United Kingdom
Apocalyptic films
Australian disaster films
Australian political films
Australian science fiction drama films
Australian speculative fiction films
Australian television docudramas
Australian television films
Australian alternative history films
BBC television docudramas
British alternative history films
British television films
British disaster films
British science fiction drama films
British speculative fiction films
British survival films
British war drama films
Cold War films
Disaster television films
Films about nuclear war and weapons
Films directed by Mick Jackson
Films set in 1988
Films set in 1983
Films set in 1998
Films set in 2001
Films set in 2003
Films set in England
Films set in Sheffield
Films set in Yorkshire
Films shot in Yorkshire
Nine Network specials
Australian post-apocalyptic films
British post-apocalyptic films
British pregnancy films
Science fiction television films
TBS (American TV channel) original programming
Films about World War III